Providencia is a district of the province of Luya, Peru.

External links
Providencia district official website 

Districts of the Luya Province
Districts of the Amazonas Region